Goran Navojec (born 10 October 1970) is a Croatian actor and musician. In his three decade long career, Navojec has starred in numerous films including The Three Men of Melita Žganjer (1998), God Forbid a Worse Thing Should Happen (2002), Long Dark Night (2004), Two Players from the Bench (2005), The Parade (2011) and Our Everyday Life (2015). He has also had prominent roles on television, including the gawky, vulnerable doctor Toni Grgeč in the comedy series Naša mala klinika (2004–2007) and comical but tough Refko Mujkić  in Lud, zbunjen, normalan (2010–2015).

He has appeared regularly on stage, including a lauded performance as the title prince in a 2004 production of Hamlet. He has also worked for various American and British stage and screen productions, including Coriolanus and Mission: Impossible – Ghost Protocol (both 2011). 

For his body of work, Navojec has received critical acclaim and numerous awards. For his role in 2016's Sve najbolje, he won a Golden Arena for Best Supporting Actor.

His robust, distinct bass-baritone voice has landed him prolific roles within voice-work for numerous Croatian-language dubs of animated features and radio dramas. He has voiced Mr. Ray in the Finding Nemo franchise (2003–2016), Junior in Home on the Range (2004), Boog in Open Season (2006), Bad Bill in Rango (2011) and Bomb in The Angry Birds Movies (2016, 2019).

Apart from his eminent acting career, he has also performed as a musician. Since 2010, he has been a part of Bosnian pop-rock band Karne, a group he formed alongside Miraj Grbić and Feđa Isović. With Karne, Navojec released one album called Diktatura amatera in 2012.

Selected filmography

Film

Television

Discography

with Karne
Diktatura amatera – 2012

References

External links

1970 births
Living people
People from Bjelovar
20th-century Croatian male actors
21st-century Croatian male actors
20th-century Croatian writers
21st-century Croatian writers
Croatian dramatists and playwrights
Croatian television presenters
Croatian comedians
Croatian screenwriters
Croatian male film actors
Croatian male stage actors
Croatian male television actors
Croatian male voice actors
Vladimir Nazor Award winners
Golden Arena winners
Croatian Theatre Award winners
Croatian theatre directors
Croatian television directors
Croatian film directors
Croatian film producers
21st-century Croatian male singers
Croatian guitarists
Croatian baritones
Croatian composers
Croatian singer-songwriters
Rhythm guitarists